The following tables list by region the candidates for the 2022 Quebec general election.

Number of candidates by party

Abbreviations guide
Abbreviations of political parties used in these tables:

AFC – Alliance pour la famille et les communautés
Auto. – Équipe autonomiste
BM – Bloc Montréal
CaPQ – Canadian Party of Québec
CAQ – Coalition Avenir Québec
Climat – Climat Québec
Conservative – Conservative Party of Quebec
Cul. – Parti culinaire du Québec
DD – Démocratie directe
Green – Green Party of Québec
Hum. – Parti humain du Québec
Ind. – Independent
Liberal – Quebec Liberal Party
Libertarien – Parti libertarien du Québec
ML – Marxist–Leninist Party of Québec
ND – No designation
Nul – Parti nul
P51 – Parti 51
PAPÉ – Parti accès propriété et équité
PQ – Parti Québécois
QS – Québec solidaire
UFF – L'union fait la force
UN – Union nationale

Candidates and results
† indicates that the incumbent is not seeking re-election.
Bold indicates party leader.
Strikethrough indicates a candidate that has been disqualified or withdrew. 

The source for all candidates is the Official list of candidates published by Élections Québec.

Bas-Saint-Laurent

|-
| style="background:whitesmoke;"|Côte-du-Sud
||
|Mathieu Rivest
|
|Sylvain Lemieux
|
|Michel Forget
|
|Guillaume Dufour
|
|Frédéric Poulin
|
|
|
|Sylvain Cloutier (Auto.)
||
|Marie-Eve Proulx †
|-
| style="background:whitesmoke;"|Matane-Matapédia
|
|Jean-Sébastien Barriault
|
|Harley Ryan Lounsbury
||
|Pascal Bérubé
|
|Marie-Phare Boucher
|
|Alexandre Leblanc
|
|
|
|Madeleine Rose (UFF)
||
|Pascal Bérubé
|-
| style="background:whitesmoke;"|Rimouski
||
|Maïté Blanchette Vézina
|
|Claude Laroche
|
|Samuel Ouellet
|
|Carol-Ann Kack
|
|Stéphanie Du Mesnil
|
|Pierre Beaudoin 
|
|Danielle Mélanie Gaudreau (DD)
||
|Harold LeBel †
|-
| style="background:whitesmoke;"|Rivière-du-Loup–Témiscouata
||
|Amélie Dionne
|
|Louis Bellemare
|
|Félix Rioux
|
|Myriam Lapointe-Gagnon
|
|Louise Moreault
|
|Carole Sierpien 
|
|
||
|Denis Tardif †
|}

Saguenay–Lac-Saint-Jean

|-
| style="background:whitesmoke;"|Chicoutimi
||
|Andrée Laforest
|
|Gabriel Caron
|
|Alice Villeneuve
|
|Adrien Guibert-Barthez
|
|Éric Girard
|
|
|
|
||
|Andrée Laforest
|-
| style="background:whitesmoke;"|Dubuc
||
|François Tremblay
|
|Berry Zinga Nkuni
|
|Émile Simard
|
|Andrée-Anne Brillant
|
|Tommy Pageau
|
|Gilbert Simard
|
|
||
|François Tremblay
|-
| style="background:whitesmoke;"|Jonquière
||
|Yannick Gagnon
|
|Wilda Solon
|
|Caroline Dubé
|
|Karla Cynthia Garcia Martinez
|
|Isabelle Champagne
|
|
|
|Line Bélanger (Nul)
||
|Sylvain Gaudreault †
|-
| style="background:whitesmoke;"|Lac-Saint-Jean
||
|Eric Girard
|
|Tricia Murray
|
|William Fradette
|
|Elsa Moulin
|
|Luc Martel
|
|Martin Lavoie
|
|Chantale Villeneuve (Libertarien)
||
|Éric Girard
|-
| style="background:whitesmoke;"|Roberval
||
|Nancy Guillemette
|
|Maxim Lavoie
|
|Patrice Bouchard
|
|Michaël Ottereyes
|
|Samuel Gaudreault
|
|Lynda Lalancette
|
|
||
|Nancy Guillemette
|}

Capitale-Nationale

|-
| style="background:whitesmoke;"|Charlesbourg
||
|Jonatan Julien
|
|Mahamadou Sissoko
|
|Priscilla Corbeil
|
|Ève Duhaime
|
|Jean Domingue
|
|Odevie Essaidi
|
|
|
|Daniel Pelletier (DD)
David Cantin (P51)
||
|Jonatan Julien
|-
| style="background:whitesmoke;"|Charlevoix–Côte-de-Beaupré
||
|Kariane Bourassa
|
|Michel Bureau
|
|Lucien Rodrigue
|
|Myriam Fortin
|
|Odré Lacombe 
|
|
|
|
|
|Stefany Tremblay (DD)
||
|Émilie Foster †
|-
| style="background:whitesmoke;"|Chauveau
||
|Sylvain Lévesque
|
|Igor Pivovar
|
|Charles-Hubert Riverin
|
|Jimena Ruiz Aragon
|
|Éric Duhaime
|
|
|
|Christine Lepage 
|
|Renaud Blais (Nul)
Nicolas Bouffard Savoie (Auto.)
||
|Sylvain Lévesque
|-
| style="background:whitesmoke;"|Jean-Lesage
|
|Christiane Gamache
|
|Charles Robert
|
|Michaël Potvin
||
|Sol Zanetti
|
|Denise Peter
|
|Félix-Antoine Bérubé-Simard
|
|Mario Ledoux 
|
|Lucie Perreault (DD)
Claude Moreau (ML)
||
|Sol Zanetti
|-
| style="background:whitesmoke;"|Jean-Talon
||
|Joëlle Boutin
|
|Julie White
|
|Gabriel Coulombe
|
|Olivier Bolduc
|
|Sébastien Clavet
|
|Alexandre Dallaire
|
|Julien Cardinal 
|
|Stéphane Pouleur (Auto.)
||
|Joëlle Boutin
|-
| style="background:whitesmoke;"|La Peltrie
||
|Éric Caire
|
|Frédéric Doumalin
|
|Martin Trudel
|
|Lucie Villeneuve
|
|Stéphane Lachance
|
|Sandra Mara Riedo
|
|Alain Fortin
|
|Martin Grand'Maison (DD)
Olivier Grondin (Nul)
||
|Éric Caire
|-
| style="background:whitesmoke;"|Louis-Hébert
||
|Geneviève Guilbault
|
|Dominic Cardinal
|
|Victor Dubuc
|
|Steven Lachance
|
|Marika Robitaille
|
|Daydree Vendette
|
|
|
|Yolaine Brochu (Auto.)
Jean-Pierre Hamel (DD)
||
|Geneviève Guilbault
|-
| style="background:whitesmoke;"|Montmorency
||
|Jean-François Simard
|
|Mustapha Berri
|
|Cynthia Therrien
|
|Annie-Pierre Bélanger
|
|Mylene Bouchard
|
|Nicholas Lescarbeau
|
|
|
|Jean Bédard (ML)
||
|Jean-François Simard
|-
| style="background:whitesmoke;"|Portneuf
||
|Vincent Caron
|
|Patrick Hayes
|
|Alexandre Mc Cabe
|
|Anne-Marie Melançon
|
|Jacinthe-Eve Arel
|
|
|
|
|
|Patrick Bourson (Ind.)
Karine Simard (DD)
||
|Vincent Caron
|-
| style="background:whitesmoke;"|Taschereau
|
|Pascale St-Hilaire
|
|Ahmed Lamine Touré
|
|Jeanne Robin
||
|Étienne Grandmont
|
|Marie-Josée Hélie
|
|Andrew Karim
|
|Jean-François Joubert
|
|Guy Boivin (Auto.)
Marie-Soleil Fillion (Ind.)
||
|Catherine Dorion †
|-
| style="background:whitesmoke;"|Vanier-Les Rivières
||
|Mario Asselin
|
|Karl Filion
|
|William Duquette
|
|Karoline Boucher
|
|Donald Gagnon
|
|Kadidia Mahamane Bamba
|
|Jean Cloutier 
|
|Mathieu Guillemette (Ind.)
||
|Mario Asselin
|}

Mauricie

|-
| style="background:whitesmoke;"|Champlain
||
|Sonia LeBel
|
|Jérémy Leblanc
|
|Alexandre Litalien
|
|Marjolaine Trottier
|
|Steve Massicotte
|
|Bianca Nancy Pinel
|
|
||
|Sonia LeBel
|-
| style="background:whitesmoke;"|Laviolette–Saint-Maurice
||
|Marie-Louise Tardif
|
|Kévin Nzoula-Mendome
|
|Pascal Bastarache
|
|France Lavigne
|
|Pierre-David Tremblay
|
|Raoul Parent
|
|Jean-Patrick Berthiaume (Ind.)
Josée St-Georges (AFC)
||
|Marie-Louise Tardif
|-
| style="background:whitesmoke;"|Maskinongé
||
|Simon Allaire
|
|Alexandra Malenfant-Veilleux
|
|Dominique Gélinas
|
|Simon Piotte
|
|Serge Noël
|
|Françoise Boisvert
|
|Alain Bélanger (Ind.)Gilles Brodeur (P51)Daniel Simon (Green)
||
|Simon Allaire
|-
| style="background:whitesmoke;"|Trois-Rivières
||
|Jean Boulet
|
|Adams Tekougoum
|
|Laurent Vézina
|
|Steven Roy Cullen
|
|Karine Pépin
|
|Georges Samman
|
|Éric Trottier (Climat)
||
|Jean Boulet
|}

Estrie

|-
| style="background:whitesmoke;"|Brome-Missisquoi
||
|Isabelle Charest
|
|Claude Vadeboncoeur
|
|Guillaume Paquet
|
|Alexandre Legault
|
|Stéphanie Prévost
|
|Pierre Fontaine
|
|Sébastien Houle (Ind.)Lynn Moore (CaPQ)Caitlin Moynan (Green)Tommy Quirion-Bouchard (Climat)
||
|Isabelle Charest
|-
| style="background:whitesmoke;"|Granby
||
|François Bonnardel
|
|Penny Lamarre
|
|Guy Bouthillier
|
|Anne-Sophie Legault
|
|Stéphane Bernier
|
|
|
|Jimmy Paquin (Auto.)
Andrzej Wisniowski (Green)
||
|François Bonnardel
|-
| style="background:whitesmoke;"|Mégantic
||
|François Jacques
|
|Eloïse Gagné
|
|André Duncan
|
|Marilyn Ouellet
|
|Mathieu Chenard
|
|
|
|André Giguère (P51)
||
|François Jacques
|-
| style="background:whitesmoke;"|Orford
||
|Gilles Bélanger
|
|Vicki-May Hamm
|
|Monique Allard
|
|Kenza Sassi
|
|Martin Lamontagne Lacasse
|
|Joel Lacroix 
|
|Mark Gandey (CaPQ)
||
|Gilles Bélanger
|-
| style="background:whitesmoke;"|Richmond
||
|André Bachand
|
|Mona Louis-Jean
|
|Jacinthe Caron
|
|Philippe Pagé
|
|Marylaine Bélair
|
|Richard Magnan 
|
|Raymond de Martin (ND)
||
|André Bachand
|-
| style="background:whitesmoke;"|Saint-François
||
|Geneviève Hébert
|
|Claude Charron
|
|Sylvie Tanguay
|
|Mélissa Généreux
|
|Dany Bernier
|
|
|
|Olivier Dion (Climat)
Colleen McInerney (CaPQ)
||
|Geneviève Hébert
|-
| style="background:whitesmoke;"|Sherbrooke
|
|Caroline St-Hilaire
|
|François Vaes
|
|Yves Bérubé-Lauzière
||
|Christine Labrie
|
|Zoée St-Amand
|
|Alexandre Asselin
|
|Alain Barbier (Climat)Raphaëlle Dompierre (Nul)Victoria Karny (Green)
||
|Christine Labrie
|}

Montréal

East

|-
| style="background:whitesmoke;"|Anjou–Louis-Riel
||
|Karine Boivin Roy
|
|Chantal Gagnon
|
|Yastene Adda
|
|Laurence Pageau
|
|Genevieve Deneault
|
|
|
|Claude Gélinas
|
|Katy LeRougetel (ND)
||
|Lise Thériault †
|-
| style="background:whitesmoke;"|Bourassa-Sauvé
|
|Absa Diallo
||
|Madwa-Nika Cadet
|
|Zacharie Robitaille
|
|Ricardo Gustave
|
|Carmel-Antoine Bessard
|
|Omar Ahmed
|
|
|
|Shawn Lalande McLean (PAPÉ)
Smaille Toussaint (Ind.)
||
|Paule Robitaille †
|-
| style="background:whitesmoke;"|Camille-Laurin
|
|Richard Campeau
|
|Christina Eyangos
||
|Paul St-Pierre Plamondon
|
|
|
|Christos Karteris
|
|Bourama Keita
|
|Jean-Pierre Émond
|
|Charles Mc Nicoll (Auto.)
Grace St-Gelais (DD)
||
|Richard Campeau
|-
| style="background:whitesmoke;"|Gouin
|
|Catherine Pelletier
|
|Rita Ikhouane
|
|Vincent Delorme
||
|Gabriel Nadeau-Dubois
|
|Jayson Paquette Gendron
|
|Valérie Vedrines
|
|
|
|Jean-Benoit Garneau-Bédard (Nul)
Chef Thémis (Cul.)
||
|Gabriel Nadeau-Dubois
|-
| style="background:whitesmoke;"|Hochelaga-Maisonneuve
|
|Rebecca McCann
|
|Line Flore Tchetmi
|
|Stephan Fogaing
||
|Alexandre Leduc
|
|Louise Poudrier
|
|Wejden Chouchene
|
|James Strayer
|
|Christine Dandenault (ML)
||
|Alexandre Leduc
|-
| style="background:whitesmoke;"|Jeanne-Mance–Viger
|
|Julie De Martino
||
|Filomena Rotiroti
|
|Laurence Massey
|
|Marie-Josée Forget
|
|Chakib Saad
|
|Alessandra Szilagyi
|
|
|
|Giovanni Manfredi (CaPQ)
||
|Filomena Rotiroti
|-
| style="background:whitesmoke;"|LaFontaine
|
|Loredana Bacchi
||
|Marc Tanguay
|
|Shawn Vermette-Tassoni
|
|Anne B-Godbout
|
|Yassir Madih
|
|Quinn Brunet
|
|
|
|
||
|Marc Tanguay
|-
| style="background:whitesmoke;"|Laurier-Dorion
|
|Vicki Marcoux
|
|Deepak Awasti
|
|Maxime Larochelle
||
|Andrés Fontecilla
|
|Guy Diotte
|
|Ismaila Marega
|
|Anthony Van Duyse
|
|Amir Khan (BM)Mathieu Marcil (Nul)Amélie Villeneuve (Cul.)
||
|Andrés Fontecilla
|-
| style="background:whitesmoke;"|Maurice-Richard
|
|Audrey Murray
|
|Jonathan Marleau
|
|Chantal Jorg
||
|Haroun Bouazzi
|
|Louise Sexton
|
|Gilles Fournelle
|
|Patrick Bouchardy
|
|Kassandre Chéry Théodat (Ind.)
Andrea Di Stefano (BM)
||
|Marie Montpetit †
|-
| style="background:whitesmoke;"|Mercier
|
|Florence Lavictoire
|
|Catherine Boundjia
|
|Sabrina Mercier-Ullhorn
||
|Ruba Ghazal
|
|Emmanuel Da Costa
|
|Véronique Langlois
|
|
|
|Jenny Cartwright (Nul)
||
|Ruba Ghazal
|-
| style="background:whitesmoke;"|Pointe-aux-Trembles
||
|Chantal Rouleau
|
|Byanca Jeune
|
|Jocelyn Desjardins
|
|Simon Tremblay-Pepin
|
|Yves Beaulieu
|
|Alex Di Pardo
|
|Marc Michaud
|
|Louis Chandonnet (Auto.)
Geneviève Royer (ML)
||
|Chantal Rouleau
|-
| style="background:whitesmoke;"|Rosemont
|
|Sandra O'Connor
|
|Sherlyne Duverneau
|
|Pierre-Luc Brillant
||
|Vincent Marissal
|
|Marie-France Lemay
|
|Jamie D’Souza
|
|Jean-François Racine
|
|
||
|Vincent Marissal
|-
| style="background:whitesmoke;"|Sainte-Marie–Saint-Jacques
|
|Aurélie Diep
|
|Christopher Baenninger
|
|Phoeby Laplante
||
|Manon Massé
|
|Stéfan Marquis
|
|Hailey Roop
|
|Jency Mercier
|
|Linda Sullivan (ML)
||
|Manon Massé
|-
| style="background:whitesmoke;"|Viau
|
|Justine Savard
||
|Frantz Benjamin
|
|Marc-Antoine Lecompte
|
|Renée-Chantal Belinga
|
|Alex Tembel
|
|Manel Chaouche
|
|Serge Ricard
|
|Marc II Réjouis (BM)
||
|Frantz Benjamin
|}

West

|-
| style="background:whitesmoke;"|Acadie
|
|Rosmeri Otoya Celis
||
|André A. Morin
|
|Véronique Lecours
|
|Elyse Lévesque
|
|Stéphanie Gentile
|
|Roula Al Nseir
|
|
|
|
||
|Christine St-Pierre †
|-
| style="background:whitesmoke;"|D'Arcy-McGee
|
|Junlian Leblanc
||
|Elisabeth Prass
|
|Renée-Claude Lafontaine
|
|Hilal Pilavci
|
|Bonnie Feigenbaum
|
|Moussa Seck
|
|Marc Perez
|
|Joel Debellefeuille (BM)
Diane Johnston (ML)
||
|David Birnbaum †
|-
| style="background:whitesmoke;"|Jacques-Cartier
|
|Rébecca Guénard-Chouinard
||
|Gregory Kelley
|
|Chantal Beauregard
|
|Marie-Ève Mathieu
|
|Louis-Charles Fortier
|
|Virginie Beaudet
|
|Arthur Fischer
|
|
||
|Greg Kelley
|-
| style="background:whitesmoke;"|Marguerite-Bourgeoys
|
|Vicky Michaud
||
|Fred Beauchemin
|
|Suzanne Tremblay
|
|Angélique Soleil Lavoie
|
|Aleksa Drakul
|
|Carole Thériault
|
|
|
|Serge Bellemare (Climat)
Keeton Clarke (BM)
||
|Hélène David †
|-
| style="background:whitesmoke;"|Marquette
|
|Marc Baaklini
||
|Enrico Ciccone
|
|Stéphane Richard
|
|Jérémy Côté
|
|Sam Nassr
|
|Shameem Jauffur
|
|
|
|Félix Vincent Ardea (ND)
||
|Enrico Ciccone
|-
| style="background:whitesmoke;"|Mont-Royal–Outremont
|
|Sarah Beaumier
||
|Michelle Setlakwe
|
|Ophélie Bastien
|
|Isabelle Leblanc
|
|Sabrina Ait Akil
|
|Malik Guelmi
|
|Anne Goldberg Harrison
|
|David A Cherniak (Nul)
||
|Pierre Arcand †
|-
| style="background:whitesmoke;"|Nelligan
|
|Cynthia Lapierre
||
|Monsef Derraji
|
|Jocelyn Caron
|
|Maxime Larue-Bourdages
|
|Gary Charles
|
|Daniel Reiniger
|
|Jean Marier
|
|Neena Hanif (BM)
Michael Hennawy (DD)
||
|Monsef Derraji
|-
| style="background:whitesmoke;"|Notre-Dame-de-Grâce
|
|Geneviève Lemay
||
|Désirée McGraw
|
|Cloé Rose Jenneau
|
|Élisabeth Labelle
|
|Roy Eappen
|
|Alex Tyrrell
|
|Constantine Eliadis
|
|Rachel Hoffman (ML)
Balarama Holness (BM)
||
|Kathleen Weil †
|-
| style="background:whitesmoke;"|Robert-Baldwin
|
|Maïté Beaudoin
||
|Brigitte Garceau
|
|Alix Martel
|
|Marieve Ruel
|
|Axel Lellouche
|
|David MacFarquhar
|
|Jonathan Gray
|
|Qaiser Choudhry (BM)
||
|Carlos Leitão †
|-
| style="background:whitesmoke;"|Saint-Henri–Sainte-Anne
|
|Nicolas Huard-Isabelle
||
|Dominique Anglade
|
|Julie Daubois
|
|Guillaume Cliche-Rivard
|
|Mischa White
|
|Jean-Pierre Duford
|
|
|
|Esther Gaudreault (DD)
Janusz Kaczorowski (BM)
||
|Dominique Anglade
|-
| style="background:whitesmoke;"|Saint-Laurent
|
|Mélanie Gauthier
||
|Marwah Rizqy
|
|Karl Dugal
|
|Gérard Briand
|
|Catherine St-Clair
|
|Othmane Benzekri
|
|Myrtis-Eirene Fossey
|
|Rizwan Muhammad Rajput (BM)
||
|Marwah Rizqy
|-
| style="background:whitesmoke;"|Verdun
|
|Véronique Tremblay
|
|Isabelle Melançon
|
|Claudia Valdivia
||
|Alejandra Zaga Mendez
|
|Lucien Koty
|
|Jannie Pellerin
|
|Scott Kilbride
|
|Fernand Deschamps (ML)
Alexandre Desmarais (Climat)

Marc-André Milette (Nul)

Alain Rioux (AFC)
||
|Isabelle Melançon
|-
| style="background:whitesmoke;"|Westmount–Saint-Louis
|
|Maria-Luisa Torres-Piaggio
||
|Jennifer Maccarone
|
|Florence Racicot
|
|David Touchette
|
|Katya Rossokhata
|
|Sam Kuhn
|
|Colin Standish
|
|Heidi Small (BM)
||
|Jennifer Maccarone
|}

Outaouais

|-
| style="background:whitesmoke;"|Chapleau
||
|Mathieu Lévesque
|
|Assumpta Ndengeyingoma
|
|Marisa Gutierrez
|
|Sabrina Labrecque-Boivin
|
|Matthieu Kadri
|
|
|
|Anne-Marie Meunier (Climat)
Pierre Soublière (ML)
||
|Mathieu Lévesque
|-
| style="background:whitesmoke;"|Gatineau
||
|Robert Bussière
|
|Caryl Green
|
|Raphaël Déry
|
|Laura Avalos
|
|Joëlle Jammal
|
|
|
|Robert Dupuis (DD)
Danilo Velasquez (CaPQ)
||
|Robert Bussière
|-
| style="background:whitesmoke;"|Hull
||
|Suzanne Tremblay
|
|Maryse Gaudreault
|
|Camille Pellerin-Forget
|
|Mathieu Perron-Dufour
|
|Lise Couture
|
|Rachid Jemmah
|
|
||
|Maryse Gaudreault
|-
| style="background:whitesmoke;"|Papineau
||
|Mathieu Lacombe
|
|Wittlyn Kate Semervil
|
|Audrey-Ann Chicoine
|
|Marie-Claude Latourelle
|
|Marc Carrière
|
|Melissa Arbour
|
|Cédric Brazeau (DD)
||
|Mathieu Lacombe
|-
| style="background:whitesmoke;"|Pontiac
|
|Corinne Canuel-Jolicoeur
||
|André Fortin
|
|Jolaine Paradis-Châteauneuf
|
|Mike Owen Sebagenzi
|
|Terrence Watters
|
|Pierre Cyr
|
|William Twolan (CaPQ)
||
|André Fortin
|}

Abitibi-Témiscamingue

|-
| style="background:whitesmoke;"|Abitibi-Est
||
|Pierre Dufour
|
|Jean-Maurice Matte
|
|Jacline Rouleau
|
|Benjamin Gingras
|
|Maxym Perron-Tellier
|
|
||
|Pierre Dufour
|-
| style="background:whitesmoke;"|Abitibi-Ouest
||
|Suzanne Blais
|
|Guy Bourgeois
|
|Samuel Doré
|
|Alexis Lapierre
|
|François Vigneault
|
|Jonathan Blanchette (UN)
||
|Suzanne Blais
|-
| style="background:whitesmoke;"|Rouyn-Noranda–Témiscamingue
||
|Daniel Bernard
|
|Arnaud Warolin
|
|Jean-François Vachon
|
|Émilise Lessard-Therrien
|
|Robert Daigle
|
|Chantal Corswarem (Green)
||
|Émilise Lessard-Therrien
|}

Côte-Nord

|-
| style="background:whitesmoke;"|Duplessis
||
|Kateri Champagne Jourdain
|
|Chamroeun Khuon
|
|Marilou Vanier
|
|Uapukun Mestokosho
|
|Roberto Stea
|
|Jacques Gélineau
|
|
||
|Lorraine Richard †
|-
| style="background:whitesmoke;"|René-Lévesque
||
|Yves Montigny
|
|Marc Duperron
|
|Jeff Dufour Tremblay
|
|Audrey Givern-Héroux
|
|Marie-Renée Raymond
|
|Richard Delisle
|
|(Philippe) Gilles Babin 
||
|Martin Ouellet †
|}

Nord-du-Québec

|-
| style="background:whitesmoke;"|Ungava
||
|Denis Lamothe
|
|Tunu Napartuk
|
|Christine Moore
|
|Maïtée Labrecque-Saganash
|
|Nancy Lalancette
||
|Denis Lamothe
|}

Gaspésie–Îles-de-la-Madeleine

|-
| style="background:whitesmoke;"|Bonaventure
||
|Catherine Blouin
|
|Christian Cyr
|
|Alexis Deschênes
|
|Catherine Cyr Wright
|
|François Therrien
|
|Anne Marie Lauzon (UFF)
Jocelyn Rioux (Climat)
||
|Sylvain Roy †
|-
| style="background:whitesmoke;"|Gaspé
||
|Stéphane Sainte-Croix
|
|Michel Marin
|
|Méganne Perry Mélançon
|
|Yv Bonnier Viger
|
|Pier-Luc Bouchard
|
|
||
|Méganne Perry Mélançon
|-
| style="background:whitesmoke;"|Îles-de-la-Madeleine
|
|Jonathan Lapierre
|
|Gil Thériault
||
|Joël Arseneau
|
|Jean-Philippe Déraspe
|
|Evan Leblanc
|
|
||
|Joël Arseneau
|}

Chaudière-Appalaches

|-
| style="background:whitesmoke;"|Beauce-Nord
||
|Luc Provençal
|
|Clermont Rouleau
|
|Paméla Lavoie-Savard
|
|François Jacques-Côté
|
|Olivier Dumais
|
|Gwendoline Mathieu-Poulin (Climat)
||
|Luc Provençal
|-
| style="background:whitesmoke;"|Beauce-Sud
||
|Samuel Poulin
|
|Antoine Poulin
|
|Jean-François Major
|
|Olivier Fecteau
|
|Jonathan Poulin
|
|Hans Mercier (P51)
||
|Samuel Poulin
|-
| style="background:whitesmoke;"|Bellechasse
||
|Stéphanie Lachance
|
|François Bégin
|
|Jean-Daniel Fontaine
|
|Jérôme D'Auteuil Sirois
|
|Michel Tardif
|
|
||
|Stéphanie Lachance
|-
| style="background:whitesmoke;"|Chutes-de-la-Chaudière
||
|Martine Biron
|
|Wafa Oueslati
|
|François-Noël Brault
|
|Caroline Thibault
|
|Mario Fortier
|
|
||
|Marc Picard †
|-
| style="background:whitesmoke;"|Lévis
||
|Bernard Drainville
|
|Richard Garon
|
|Pierre-Gilles Morel
|
|Valérie Cayouette-Guilloteau
|
|Karine Laflamme
|
|Mehdi Lahlou (Green)
André Voyer (Climat)
||
|François Paradis †
|-
| style="background:whitesmoke;"|Lotbinière-Frontenac
||
|Isabelle Lecours
|
|Normand Côté
|
|Louise Marchand
|
|Christine Gilbert
|
|Christian Gauthier
|
|
||
|Isabelle Lecours
|}

Laval

|-
| style="background:whitesmoke;"|Chomedey
|
|George Platanitis
||
|Sona Lakhoyan Olivier
|
|Rachid Bandou
|
|Zachary Robert
|
|Konstantinos Merakos
|
|Sahbi Nablia
|
|Federica Gangai (BM)
||
|Guy Ouellette †
|-
| style="background:whitesmoke;"|Fabre
||
|Alice Abou-Khalil
|
|Sonia Baudelot
|
|Catherine Dansereau-Redhead
|
|Jessy Léger
|
|Stéphane Turmel
|
|Lynn Buchanan
|
|
||
|Monique Sauvé †
|-
| style="background:whitesmoke;"|Laval-des-Rapides
||
|Céline Haytayan
|
|Saul Polo
|
|Andréanne Fiola
|
|Josée Chevalier
|
|Nicolas Lussier-Clément
|
|Zied Damergi
|
|
||
|Saul Polo
|-
| style="background:whitesmoke;"|Mille-Îles
|
|Julie Séide
||
|Virginie Dufour
|
|Michel Lachance
|
|Guillaume Lajoie
|
|Ange Claude Bigilimana
|
|Bianca Jitaru
|
|
||
|Francine Charbonneau †
|-
| style="background:whitesmoke;"|Sainte-Rose
||
|Christopher Skeete
|
|Michel Trottier
|
|Lyne Jubinville
|
|Karine Cliche
|
|Stéphanie Beauchamp
|
|Pierrette Kamning Nguendjong
|
|Simon Filiatrault (Climat)
Kevin Fortin (P51)
||
|Christopher Skeete
|-
| style="background:whitesmoke;"|Vimont
||
|Valérie Schmaltz
|
|Anabela Monteiro
|
|Nathalie Lavigne
|
|Josée Bélanger
|
|Stefano Piscitelli
|
|Rita Lo Cicero
|
|
||
|Jean Rousselle †
|}

Lanaudière

|-
| style="background:whitesmoke;"|Berthier
||
|Caroline Proulx
|
|Hassan Abdallah
|
|Julie Boucher
|
|Amélie Drainville
|
|Benoit Primeau
|
|Claire Aubin (Climat)
||
|Caroline Proulx
|-
| style="background:whitesmoke;"|Joliette
||
|François St-Louis
|
|Diana Mélissa Crispin
|
|Véronique Venne
|
|Flavie Trudel
|
|Pascal Laurin
|
|
||
|Véronique Hivon †
|-
| style="background:whitesmoke;"|L'Assomption
||
|François Legault
|
|Thomas Ano-Dumas
|
|Catherine Provost
|
|Martin Lefebvre
|
|Ernesto Almeida
|
|
||
|François Legault
|-
| style="background:whitesmoke;"|Masson
||
|Mathieu Lemay
|
|Gabriel Bourret
|
|Stéphane Handfield
|
|Émile Bellerose-Simard
|
|François Truchon
|
|Marc-André Bélisle (Green)
||
|Mathieu Lemay
|-
| style="background:whitesmoke;"|Repentigny
||
|Pascale Déry
|
|Virginie Bouchard
|
|Aïcha Van Dun
|
|Ednal Marc
|
|Serge Cloutier
|
|David Brisebois (Climat)
||
|Lise Lavallée †
|-
| style="background:whitesmoke;"|Rousseau
||
|Louis-Charles Thouin
|
|Estelle Regina Lokrou
|
|Pierre Vanier
|
|Ernesto Castro Roch
|
|Gisèle DesRoches
|
|
||
|Louis-Charles Thouin
|-
| style="background:whitesmoke;"|Terrebonne
||
|Pierre Fitzgibbon
|
|Lindsay Jean
|
|Geneviève Couture
|
|Nadia Poirier
|
|Daniela Andreeva
|
|Marie-France Meloche (DD)
Nazar Tarpinian (Green)
||
|Pierre Fitzgibbon
|}

Laurentides

|-
| style="background:whitesmoke;"|Argenteuil
||
|Agnès Grondin
|
|Philippe LeBel
|
|François Girard
|
|Marcel Lachaine
|
|Karim Elayoubi
|
|Luis Alvarez
|
|Jean Lalonde (CaPQ)
Marie-Eve Milot (DD)
||
|Agnès Grondin
|-
| style="background:whitesmoke;"|Bertrand
||
|France-Élaine Duranceau
|
|André Nadeau
|
|Guillaume Freire
|
|Julie Francoeur
|
|Philippe Meloni
|
|Karine Steinberger
|
|Samuel Fortin (Climat)
Marie-Eve Ouellette (Hum.)
||
|Nadine Girault †
|-
| style="background:whitesmoke;"|Blainville
||
|Mario Laframboise
|
|Alexandre Mercho
|
|Frédéric Labelle
|
|Éric Michaud
|
|Grace Daou
|
|
|
|Marie-France Hanna (DD)
||
|Mario Laframboise
|-
| style="background:whitesmoke;"|Deux-Montagnes
||
|Benoit Charette
|
|Marc Allaire
|
|Guillaume Lalonde
|
|Olivier Côté
|
|Isabelle Baril
|
|Amavi Tagodoe
|
|Hélèna Courteau (Climat)
Dominique Dubois-Massey (UFF)
||
|Benoit Charette
|-
| style="background:whitesmoke;"|Groulx
||
|Eric Girard
|
|Audrey Medaino-Tardif
|
|Jeanne Craig-Larouche
|
|Marie-Noëlle Aubertin
|
|Valerie Messore
|
|Victoria Shahsavar-Arshad
|
|
||
|Eric Girard
|-
| style="background:whitesmoke;"|Labelle
||
|Chantale Jeannotte
|
|Annie Bélizaire
|
|Daniel Corbeil
|
|Jasmine Roy
|
|Claude Paquin
|
|
|
|François Beauchamp (Climat)
||
|Chantale Jeannotte
|-
| style="background:whitesmoke;"|Les Plaines
||
|Lucie Lecours
|
|Elizabeth Stavrakakis
|
|Normand Ouellette
|
|Richard Jr Leblanc
|
|Ian Lavallée
|
|Mohamed Benmoumene
|
|
||
|Lucie Lecours
|-
| style="background:whitesmoke;"|Mirabel
||
|Sylvie D'Amours
|
|Isabella Giosi
|
|Carole Savoie
|
|Marjolaine Goudreau
|
|Gala Durand
|
|
|
|Pierre Larouche (UFF)
Rémi Lavoie (DD)
||
|Sylvie D'Amours
|-
| style="background:whitesmoke;"|Prévost
||
|Sonia Bélanger
|
|Suzanne Pomerleau
|
|Thérèse Chabot
|
|Rose Crevier-Dagenais
|
|Benoit Cloutier
|
|Michelle Vaz
|
|Michel Leclerc (Hum.)
||
|Marguerite Blais †
|-
| style="background:whitesmoke;"|Saint-Jérôme
||
|Youri Chassin
|
|Martin Plante
|
|Sandrine Michon
|
|Marc-Olivier Neveu
|
|Maxime Clermont
|
|Marcella Bustamante
|
|
||
|Youri Chassin
|}

Montérégie

Eastern

|-
| style="background:whitesmoke;"|Borduas
||
|Simon Jolin-Barrette
|
|Eribert Charles
|
|Paule Laprise
|
|Benoît Landry
|
|Jean-Félix Racicot
|
|Marcel Thibodeau
|
|Stephen Gauthier
|
|Thomas Thibault-Vincent (Green)
||
|Simon Jolin-Barrette
|-
| style="background:whitesmoke;"|Chambly
||
|Jean-François Roberge
|
|Lina Yunes
|
|Marie-Laurence Desgagné
|
|Vincent Michaux-St-Louis
|
|Daniel Desnoyers
|
|Sanae Chahad  
|
|Caroline Boisvert
|
|
||
|Jean-François Roberge
|-
| style="background:whitesmoke;"|Iberville
||
|Audrey Bogemans
|
|Steve Trinque
|
|Jean-Alexandre Côté
|
|Philippe Jetten-Vigeant
|
|Anne Casabonne
|
|Philippe Brassard 
|
|Jean-Charles Cléroux
|
|
||
|Claire Samson †
|-
| style="background:whitesmoke;"|Richelieu
||
|Jean-Bernard Émond
|
|Anthony Sauriol
|
|Gabriel Arpin
|
|David Dionne
|
|Marie-Ève Dionne
|
|Alejandra Velasquez  
|
|André Blanchette
|
|
||
|Jean-Bernard Émond
|-
| style="background:whitesmoke;"|Saint-Hyacinthe
||
|Chantal Soucy
|
|Agnieszka Wnorowska
|
|Alexis Gagné-Lebrun
|
|Philippe Daigneault
|
|Kim Beaudoin
|
|Julie Raiche  
|
|
|
|Gary Daigneault (Ind.)
Mustapha Jaalouk (Green)
||
|Chantal Soucy
|-
| style="background:whitesmoke;"|Saint-Jean
||
|Louis Lemieux
|
|Benjamin Roy
|
|Alexandre Girard-Duchaine
|
|Pierre-Luc Lavertu
|
|Dominick Melnitzky
|
|Denis Thériault  
|
|Raymond Choquette
|
|
||
|Louis Lemieux
|-
| style="background:whitesmoke;"|Verchères
||
|Suzanne Roy
|
|Gabriel Lévesque
|
|Cédric Gagnon-Ducharme
|
|Manon Harvey
|
|Pascal Déry
|
|Germain Dallaire 
|
|Pauline Boisvert
|
|Lucien Beauregard (Ind.)
Nadim Saikali (Green)
||
|Suzanne Dansereau †
|}

South Shore

|-
| style="background:whitesmoke;"|Beauharnois
||
|Claude Reid
|
|Marc Blanchard
|
|Claudine Desforges
|
|Emilie Poirier
|
|Chantal Dauphinais
|
|Hélène Savard
|
|Mathieu Taillefer
|
|
||
|Claude Reid
|-
| style="background:whitesmoke;"|Châteauguay
||
|Marie-Belle Gendron
|
|Jean-François Primeau
|
|Marianne Lafleur
|
|Martin Bécotte
|
|Patric Viau
|
|Stéphanie Stevenson
|
|
|
|
||
|MarieChantal Chassé †
|-
| style="background:whitesmoke;"|Huntingdon
||
|Carole Mallette
|
|Jean-Claude Poissant
|
|Nathan Leblanc
|
|Emmanuelle Perras
|
|François Gagnon
|
|José Bro
|
|
|
|Raymond Frizzell (CaPQ)
||
|Claire IsaBelle †
|-
| style="background:whitesmoke;"|La Pinière
|
|Samuel Gatien
||
|Linda Caron
|
|Suzanne Gagnon
|
|Jean-Claude Mugaba
|
|Tzarevna Bratkova
|
|Ryan Akshay Newbergher
|
|
|
|Donna Pinel (CaPQ)
||
|Gaétan Barrette †
|-
| style="background:whitesmoke;"|Laporte
||
|Isabelle Poulet
|
|Mathieu Gratton
|
|Soledad Orihuela-Bouchard
|
|Claude Lefrançois
|
|Évelyne Latreille
|
|Jean-Philippe Charest
|
|Ian Parent
|
|Herby Fremont (CaPQ)
||
|Nicole Ménard †
|-
| style="background:whitesmoke;"|La Prairie
||
|Christian Dubé
|
|Julie Guertin
|
|Sarah Joly-Simard
|
|Pierre-Marc Allaire-Daly
|
|Marie Pelletier
|
|
|
|Barbara Joannette
|
|Normand Chouinard (ML)
||
|Christian Dubé
|-
| style="background:whitesmoke;"|Marie-Victorin
||
|Shirley Dorismond
|
|Lyes Chekal
|
|Pierre Nantel
|
|Shophika Vaithyanathasarma
|
|Lara Stillo
|
|Vincent Aquin-Belleau
|
|Martine Ouellet 
|
|Pierre Chénier (ML)
Florent Portron (Auto.)
||
|Shirley Dorismond
|-
| style="background:whitesmoke;"|Montarville
||
|Nathalie Roy
|
|Lucie Gagnon
|
|Daniel Michelin
|
|Marie-Christine Veilleux
|
|Evans Henry
|
|Jeanne Dufour
|
|Isadora Lamouche 
|
|
||
|Nathalie Roy
|-
| style="background:whitesmoke;"|Sanguinet
||
|Christine Fréchette
|
|Rodrigue Asatsop
|
|Daphnée Paquin-Auger
|
|Virginie Bernier
|
|François Gibeault
|
|Halimatou Bah
|
|Martine Lajoie 
|
|Hélène Héroux (ML)
||
|Danielle McCann †
|-
| style="background:whitesmoke;"|Soulanges
||
|Marilyne Picard
|
|Catherine St-Amour
|
|Samuel Patenaude
|
|Sophie Samson
|
|Éloïse Coulombe
|
|Kristian Solarik
|
|
|
|
||
|Marilyne Picard
|-
| style="background:whitesmoke;"|Taillon
||
|Lionel Carmant
|
|Omar Cissé
|
|Andrée-Anne Bouvette-Turcot
|
|Manon Blanchard
|
|Pierre-Marc Boyer
|
|
|
|Frédéric Ouellet 
|
|Pierre Savignac (UFF)
||
|Lionel Carmant
|-
| style="background:whitesmoke;"|Vachon
||
|Ian Lafrenière
|
|Yves Mbattang
|
|Adam Wrzesien
|
|Jean-Philippe Samson
|
|Martine Boucher
|
|Juan Carlos Nino Caita
|
|Jean-Pierre Lacombe 
|
|
||
|Ian Lafrenière
|-
| style="background:whitesmoke;"|Vaudreuil
|
|Eve Bélec
||
|Marie-Claude Nichols
|
|Christopher Massé
|
|Cynthia Bilodeau
|
|Eve Théoret
|
|Kelley Boileau
|
|
|
|Jaspal Singh Ahluwalia (BM)
David Hamelin-Schuilenburg (CaPQ)

Paul Lynes (DD)
||
|Marie-Claude Nichols
|}

Centre-du-Québec

|-
| style="background:whitesmoke;"|Arthabaska
||
|Eric Lefebvre
|
|Luciana Arantes
|
|Mario Beauchesne
|
|Pascale Fortin
|
|Tarek Henoud
|
|Trystan Martel (Climat)
||
|Éric Lefebvre
|-
| style="background:whitesmoke;"|Drummond–Bois-Francs
||
|Sébastien Schneeberger
|
|Pierre Poirier
|
|Emrick Couture-Picard
|
|Tony Martel
|
|Myriam Cournoyer
|
|Marco Beauchesne (Green)
Steve Therion (Auto.)
||
|Sébastien Schneeberger
|-
| style="background:whitesmoke;"|Johnson
||
|André Lamontagne
|
|Mounirou Younoussa
|
|Jérémie Poirier
|
|Nancy Mongeau
|
|Luce Daneau
|
|Cindy Courtemanche (DD)
||
|André Lamontagne
|-
| style="background:whitesmoke;"|Nicolet-Bécancour
||
|Donald Martel
|
|Marie-Josée Jacques
|
|Philippe Dumas
|
|Jacques Thériault Watso
|
|Mario Lyonnais
|
|
||
|Donald Martel
|}

Candidate controversies
Parti Québécois Candidate for Sainte-Rose Lyne Jubinville had past social media posts which were Anti Islam.
Québec Solidaire Candidate for Camille-Laurin Marie-Eve Rancourt for removing PQ leaflets.
Parti Québécois Candidate for Laval-des-Rapides Andreanne Fiola had a past history of making porn.

Notes

References

2022 in Quebec
Candidates in Quebec provincial elections